Lamar Township may refer to the following townships in the United States:

 Lamar Township, Madison County, Arkansas
 Lamar Township, Barton County, Missouri
 Lamar Township, Clinton County, Pennsylvania